Tulisa Park is a suburb of Johannesburg, South Africa. It is located in Region F of the City of Johannesburg Metropolitan Municipality.

History
The suburb was established by mining group Gold Fields of South Africa on 24 December 1952.

Economy
The area is the site of manufacturing facilities for heavy mining equipment including bottom dump off-highway trucks.

References

Johannesburg Region F